Pangako Sa 'Yo (International title: The Promise / ) is a Philippine primetime soap opera series that aired on ABS-CBN. It stars an ensemble cast led by Kristine Hermosa, Jericho Rosales, Eula Valdez, Tonton Gutierrez and Jean Garcia. It premiered from November 13, 2000, to September 20, 2002, replacing Labs Ko Si Babe and was replaced by Bituin. It was also broadcast worldwide on TFC from February 26, 2001, to January 3, 2003.

The series is streaming online on YouTube and iWantTFC.

Plot

The story begins with the romance between Amor de Jesús (Eula Valdez) and Eduardo Buenavista (Tonton Gutierrez). Eduardo's mother, Doña Benita (Liza Lorena), opposes the relationship since Amor was a housemaid and because she wanted Eduardo to marry Claudia Zalameda (Jean Garcia) for political reasons. Doña Benita asked Eduardo's older brother, Diego (Jestoni Alarcon), who was also attracted to Amor, to separate them. Upon seeing Diego trying to rape Amor, Eduardo mistook it as them having a relationship, breaking his heart and prompts him to marry Claudia. The now-pregnant Amor was banished from the Buenavista hacienda and she returns to her mother in Manila, who was living at the Payatas dumpsite. She vows revenge on the Buenavista family when she learns that Eduardo has married Claudia.

After giving birth to her daughter, María Amor (Kristine Hermosa), Amor and her friend, Lourdes (Amy Austria-Ventura), survived by working in clubs. Amor caught the eye of a rich American named James Powers (James Cooper), who brings her to the United States. She leaves María Amor and her mother, Chayong (Perla Bautista), behind at the dumpsite and sends money to them from time to time. James Powers proves abusive towards Amor, forbidding her from returning home when a landslide hit the dumpsite. Amor, thinking that her mother and daughter had died, and in retaliation for all his abuses towards her, does not get her husband medical help when he suffered a stroke. James Powers dies and Amor inherits his fortune.

Eduardo and Claudia have two children: Angelo (Jericho Rosales) and Lia (Jodi Sta. Maria). Eduardo is the governor of the province of Punta Verde while Claudia has become the ever-elusive queen of illegal gambling in Punta Verde. Angelo is a rebel who dislikes his father while Lia is a sweet, devout Catholic teenager who cares for the feelings of her loved ones.

Amor's daughter survives the landslide and is adopted by Isko (Cris Daluz) and Belen Macaspac (Eva Darren). The couple found drawings Eduardo made for Amor, signed "Ynamorata" near the abandoned child, so they decided to call the little girl they found Ynamorata. Isko and Belen have their own children: Caloy, who hates Yna, and teenager Flerida (Hazel Ann Mendoza).

Doña Benita regretted forcing Eduardo to marry Claudia, as her daughter-in-law turned out to be cruel. On her deathbed, she tried to explain that she was the one who broke Eduardo's relationship with Amor, but died before being able to do so. To atone for her sins, Doña Benita's spirit haunts the dreams of the grown Yna.

Twenty years later, Yna and Eduardo accidentally meet, and Yna dreams of Doña Benita showing her that her past lies in the Buenavista family. Intrigued, she gets a job working as a housemaid in Eduardo's household. Yna and Angelo fall in love, much to Claudia's chagrin. She looks down on housemaids and servants, and actively makes Yna's life a living hell.

Amor Powers returns to the Philippines after making a name for herself in the business world in the United States. Amor had been planning her revenge on the Buenavistas, whom she blames for her past sufferings, as well as the assumed death of María Amor. The dilemma was that, after finding out that Yna's true father was Eduardo, Angelo and Yna were therefore thought to be half-siblings. It was later revealed that Angelo's biological father was not Eduardo, nor was it Simon Barcial (John Arcilla), Claudia's former, impoverished lover. Angelo's biological father was later revealed to be Eduardo's brother, Diego (who was also revealed to be adopted), who sired Angelo with a poor woman named Thelma, who had later died.

It also turns out that Claudia had a daughter with Simon. Claudia's father switched the babies after Doña Benita demanded a male heir (the boy that replaced the girl was revealed to be Angelo). The daughter was Clarissa (Dianne dela Fuente) and she was raised by an old woman named Puríng (Anita Linda) as María Amor. Puring had Clarissa believe she was Maria Amor de Jesús, the daughter of Amor.

To exact revenge on Amor, Claudia kills María Amor/Clarissa, but was deeply crushed when she later learned the girl's true identity. Her heart filled with more anger towards Amor, as well as regret. Claudia, together with Coring (Minnie Aguilar) and her henchmen, planned to kill the entire Buenavista family at Yna and Angelo's wedding. Thus, confronting them while holding a gun. But everyone especially Angelo and Lia made her realize how important she is to them and how she should bring out the goodness in her heart that was once filled with evil, hatred, greed and revenge. She realizes everything after Lia and Angelo gave her a hug and reconciles with everyone at the wedding. People from the wedding especially Amor and Angelo also asked forgiveness from Claudia, which she immediately accepted. While she was kneeling in front of everyone, she sees Clarissa's spirit at the altar and begs forgiveness. Claudia was forgiven by everyone but because of her past crimes, she was sentenced to lifelong imprisonment. And a little while later, Amor gave her Clarissa's ashes.

Five years later, each of the major characters are happy and reunited with their true loves: Yna becomes pregnant and marries Angelo, Claudia meets her granddaughter from her now-deceased daughter, Lia. Afterwards, she and Simon married each other inside prison. Meanwhile, Amor and Eduardo decided to live happily as a couple and married each other after 27 years of their unbreakable love for each other.

Cast and characters

Main cast 
 
Kristine Hermosa as Ynamorata ”Yna” Macaspac / María Amor de Jesús
Jericho Rosales as Angelo Buenavista
Eula Valdez as Amor de Jesús / Amor Powers
Jean Garcia as Madam Claudia Buenavista
Tonton Gutierrez as Eduardo Buenavista

Supporting cast 
Amy Austria-Ventura as Lourdes Magpantay
Jestoni Alarcon as Diego Buenavista
Patrick Garcia as Jonathan Mobido
Jodi Sta. Maria as Lía Buenavista
Vanessa del Bianco as Bea Bianca Bejerrano / Electrika Powers
Carlo Muñoz as Mark Delgado
Dianne dela Fuente as María Amor / Clarissa Barcial
Eva Darren as Belén Macaspac
Cris Daluz as Francisco "Isko" Macaspac
Hazel Ann Mendoza as Flerida Macaspac
Evangeline Pascual as Betty Mae Verseles
Minnie Aguilar as Coring
Michelle Bayle as Felicity Banks
Dennis Trillo as Ruel Pedro

Extended cast 
John Arcilla as Simón Barcial
Nikka Valencia as Julieta Macaspac
Jay Manalo as Caloy Macaspac
Luis Alandy as David San Luis
Liza Lorena as Doña Benita Buenavista
Ricky Davao as Tony Banks
Ernie Zarate as Mayor Enrique Zalameda
Flora Gasser as Pacita
Mosang as Doray
Gigette Reyes as Debra
Suzette Ranillo as Fatima Dela Merced
Bing Davao as Lorenzo Dela Merced
Sally Baderes as Nimfa Macaspac
Rey Kilay as Cookie
Perla Bautista as Chayong de Jesús
Rene Pangilinan as Rene
Kristine Garcia as Elizabeth
Anita Linda as Purificaxion
Ronnie Quizon as Badeo
Ramon Christopher as Cris
Jeffrey Hidalgo as Kenneth
Gerard Pizzaras as Rey
Paolo Contis as Vinnie
Tado as Jason
Alfred Vargas as Dyno Zuryete 
Phoemela Baranda as Queenie Bermudez
Berting Labra as Pepe
Chinggoy Alonzo as General
Gem Ramos as Lia's Friend
Ina Raymundo as Eidelweiss Guttenberg
Denise Laurel as Chammy Guttenberg
Melissa Mendez as Minerva Capito
Jiro Manio as Cocoy Dela Merced
Marc Acueza as Kit
Juan Rodrigo as Father Crispin
Onemig Bondoc as Errol Garcia
Julius Babao as himself (host, Talk TV)
Christine Bersola-Babao as herself (host, Talk TV)
Ryan Agoncillo as himself (host, Talk TV)
Janette McBride as herself (host, Talk TV)

Production
In June 2002, the Filipino Society of Composers, Authors and Publishers (FILSCAP) accused ABS-CBN of copyright infringement due to alleged unpaid royalties for its songs, with the Regional Trial Court 90 of Quezon City issuing a temporary restraining order towards ABS-CBN that prevented them from using "Pangako sa 'Yo" and other FILSCAP-owned songs in their programs for 20 days.

Reception
The soap, which ran from November 13, 2000, to September 20, 2002, spanned 481 episodes at 30 minutes each then replaced by Bituin. The show posted an all-time high rating of 64.9% during its September 2002 series finale. This is the second highest rating for any Filipino-made TV series, behind one of the airings of Esperanza on ABS-CBN in 1997, and is the all-time highest rating for any TV series finale in the Philippines.

Accolades
Asian Television Awards 2001: Runner Up - Best Drama Series
Asian Television Awards 2001: Highly Commended - Best Direction (Long Form)
15th PMPC Star Awards for Television: Best TV Series
15th PMPC Star Awards for Television: Best Actress - Eula Valdez
16th PMPC Star Awards for Television: Best Actress - Jean Garcia

International broadcast
Pangako sa 'Yo was the first Filipino television program to air in Kenya on the national broadcaster KBC and Tanzania on national broadcaster TBC formerly known as TVT and gained National popularity that’s switched from the usual Latin American soap operas. It was immensely popular in Kenya too, resulting in its second run years later on Citizen TV. Moreover, it paved the way for the many teleserye that have been broadcast in Kenya. In Malaysia, through a local satellite TV channel, Astro Bella, starting November 22, will air Pangako sa 'Yo because of high demand. It airs in Tagalog with Bahasa Melayu subtitles. Airs Monday to Friday at 11:00am with encore on the same day and also on weekends with marathon. In Singapore through local satellite TV Channel from Malaysia, Astro Prima on mio TV Channel 602 starting April 10, 2013, will air Pangako sa 'Yo because of high demand in Singapore due to this series was first shown on MediaCorp Suria in 2007. It airs in Tagalog with Bahasa Melayu subtitles. Airs Monday to Friday from 5:30 PM to 6:30 PM with an encore on the same day at 10:00 AM and also on 12 midnight on the same day.

Cambodian adaptation

Pangako sa 'Yo was adapted in Cambodia when Cambodian Television Network (CTN) acquired rights from ABS-CBN. Entitled The Promise (Khmer:សន្យាស្នេហ៍), the Cambodian version was produced by Khmer Mekong Films (KMF) and aired in Cambodia from 2013 to 2014 with 198 episodes. It was adapted to suit the Cambodian cultural context and audience sensitivities.

The Promise was broadcast peak-time on CTN, Cambodia's most popular TV channel, running three shows a week until July 2014.

Remake

The first remake of Pangako sa 'Yo debuted on May 25, 2015. It stars Jodi Sta. Maria, Ian Veneracion, Angelica Panganiban, Kathryn Bernardo and Daniel Padilla. Rory Quintos, who directed the original series, also directed the remake. The remake was produced by Star Creatives. It ended on February 12, 2016, with a total of 190 episodes.

Jodi Sta. Maria, who played Lia Buenavista in the original, was cast as Amor Powers in the 2015 remake. Two other cast members from the original version were also part of the 2015 remake - Amy Austria (who played Lourdes Magbanua in the original series) was cast as Belen Macaspac; and Richard Quan (who played Benjie Gatmaitan, the investigative reporter, in the original series) was cast as Theodore Boborol, Eduardo Buenavista's political rival.

See also
List of programs broadcast by ABS-CBN
List of ABS-CBN drama series
Pangako sa 'Yo (2015 TV series)

References

External links

 
ABS-CBN drama series
2000 Philippine television series debuts
2002 Philippine television series endings
Television series by Star Creatives
Philippine romance television series
Filipino-language television shows
Television shows set in the Philippines